Rabdophaga clavifex is a gall midge which forms galls on the buds of willow species.


Description
The tree/shrub genus Salix supports many galls, some of which are difficult to identify, particularly those caused by the gall midges in the genus Rabdophaga. R. clavifex causes a cluster of hairy buds with a club-like swelling at the tip of the shoot on sallows. Each bud contains a red or orange larva.

Distribution
Found in the following European countries; Bulgaria, Czech Republic, Denmark, Germany, Italy, Netherlands, Sweden and the United Kingdom. In the UK R. clavifex has been found in Merseyside and Yorkshire.

References

clavifex
Nematoceran flies of Europe
Gall-inducing insects
Insects described in 1891
Insect vectors of plant pathogens
Taxa named by Jean-Jacques Kieffer
Willow galls